Linda Lin Dai (26 December 1934 – 17 July 1964), born Ching Yuetyue (程月如), was a Chinese actress of Hong Kong films made in Mandarin during the 1950s–60s. She was a star actress of the Shaw Brothers Studio. She was the daughter of Cheng Siyuan (程思遠), the secretary of the KMT Chinese President Li Zongren, and Vice Chairman of the CPPCC.

Lin Dai was awarded the Best Actress at the Asia Pacific Film Festival four times for her performances in films produced by Shaw Studio. While she attended short courses on drama and linguistics at Columbia University, New York in 1958, she met and fell in love with Long Shengxun, the son of Long Yun who was a former governor of China's Yunnan province. They married on 12 February 1961 in Hong Kong.

She committed suicide at home in Hong Kong in July 1964, using an overdose of sleeping pills and inhalation of methane gas, due to family matters referred by the media as "trivial". Her death shocked the Chinese community. She left behind two unfinished films, The Lotus Lamp and Blue And Black (I and II).

Filmography 
Singing Under The Moon (Cui Cui), 1953
Spring Is in the Air, 1954
Love Is Like A Running Brook, 1956
Golden Lotus (Jin Lian Hua), 1957
Lady in Distress, 1957
Scarlet Doll (Hong Wa), 1958
Laughter And Tears, 1958
Diau Charn (Diao Chan), 1958
Cinderella And Her Little Angels, 1959
The Kingdom and the Beauty (Jiang Shan Mei Ren), 1959
Spring Frolic, 1959
Bachelors Beware, 1960
Les Belles (Qian Jiao Bai Mei), 1961
Love Without End (He Qing Qing), 1961
The Swallow, 1961
Madame White Snake (Bai She Zhuan), 1962
Love Parade, 1963
The Last Woman of Shang, 1964 
Beyond The Great Wall, 1964
The Lotus Lamp, 1965
The Blue and the Black (Lan Yu Hei), 1966
The Mirror (Xie hen jing), 1967

References

External links

 
 四届影后林黛, Sohu.com
 银幕绝色美人 四届亚太影后林黛自杀之, hinews.cn

1934 births
1964 suicides
Hong Kong film actresses
Suicides in Hong Kong
Drug-related deaths in Hong Kong
Drug-related suicides in China
People from Guilin
Actresses from Guangxi
Chinese expatriates in Hong Kong
20th-century Hong Kong actresses
20th-century Chinese actresses
Pathé Records (Hong Kong) artists
Shaw Brothers Studio